Julie Cathryn Emerson (born 1988) is an American small business owner and politician. She is from Carencro, Louisiana. She is a Republican member of the Louisiana House of Representatives for District 39 in Lafayette and St. Landry parishes in South Louisiana.

Electoral history 
On January 11, 2016, she succeeded incumbent Democratic Representative Stephen Ortego, whom she unseated in the primary election held on October 24, 2015. Emerson polled 6,149 votes (51 percent) to Ortego's 5,902 (49 percent).

In 2019, Emerson was re-elected for a second term. She won re-election with 70% of the vote.

References

1988 births
Living people
People from Carencro, Louisiana
Republican Party members of the Louisiana House of Representatives
Baptists from Louisiana
University of Louisiana at Lafayette alumni
University of South Carolina alumni
Businesspeople from Louisiana
Women state legislators in Louisiana
Southern Baptist Theological Seminary people
21st-century American women politicians
21st-century American politicians
People from Homer, Louisiana
Politicians from Lafayette, Louisiana